The Betrayal is a 1948 race film written, produced, and directed by Oscar Micheaux. He adapted it from his 1943 novel The Wind From Nowhere.

Plot

Martin Eden is a successful African-American farmer in South Dakota.  He is in love with Deborah Stewart, but he believes that she is white and that she would not be interested in him. He is unaware that Deborah also loves him.  Martin goes to Chicago to seek out a wife.  After an unsuccessful date with a cabaret singer, he reconnects with an ex-girlfriend who introduces him to Linda.  They fall in love and marry, and then return to Martin’s farm.  The couple become parents, but their happiness is short-lived when Linda’s pathologically jealous father convinces her that Martin is homicidal.  She flees the farm with their child and returns to Chicago.  Martin tracks her down in the city, but Martin is shot by Linda during a fight.  In South Dakota, Deborah discovers she is African-American.  She travels to Chicago and meets Linda, who agrees to divorce Martin so he can marry Deborah. Linda also gives her child to Deborah to raise.  Martin and Deborah return to South Dakota and Linda kills her father in revenge for his role in destroying her marriage.

Cast
William Byrd as Jack Stewart
Leroy Collins as Martin Eden
Verlie Cowan as Linda
Frances De Young as Mrs. Bowles
Vernon B. Duncan as Duval
Edward Fraction as Nelson Boudreaux
Harris Gaines as Dr. Lee
Jessie Johnson as Preble
Barbara Lee as Jessie
Yvonne Machen as Terry
Arthur McCoo as Joe Bowles
Vernetties Moore as Eunice
Alice B. Russell as Aunt Mary
Myra Stanton as Deborah
Lou Vernon as Ned Washington

Production
The Betrayal was adapted by Micheaux from his novel The Wind From Nowhere (1943), although the plot regarding racial identities in rural South Dakota was borrowed from The Homesteader (1919), Micheaux’s first film. The Betrayal marked Micheaux’s return to filmmaking after an eight-year absence following the release of The Notorious Elinor Lee (1940).

Micheaux shot The Betrayal at a studio in Fort Lee, New Jersey, with location filming in Chicago.

Micheaux named his male lead Martin Eden in honor of the eponymous hero of the Jack London novel. Leroy Collins, a non-professional actor, was cast in the role when he came to the Chicago set seeking work as a stagehand and was spotted by one of Micheaux’s assistants. This was Collins’ first and only film appearance. Collins is now a retired Chicago Public Schools administrator.

Myra Stanton, who played the role of Deborah Stewart, had modeled since the age of five. She had appeared in Ebony magazine in her teenage years and had only acted in school plays when Micheaux's wife, Alice B. Russell, called Stanton's mother with an invitation to audition for the film. Collins and Stanton fell in love during the filming and married soon after the film was done. The couple divorced four years later. Stanton is now a retired teacher.

The Betrayal was self-financed by Micheaux, and the director’s cut ran 195 minutes. Twelve minutes were cut for the film’s commercial release.

Release
The Betrayal was the first race film to have its premiere in a Broadway venue in New York City, with reserved-seat screenings at the Mansfield Theatre. Reviews of the film were overwhelmingly negative, with The New York Times complaining of "sporadically poor photography and consistently amateurish performances" within a story that "contemplates at considerable length the relations between Negroes and whites as members of the community as well as partners in marriage." Box Office also panned the film, noting "sincerity of purpose is perhaps the only redeeming feature of this all-Negro feature." The African-American media was also hostile, with the Chicago Defender criticizing the film as "a preposterous, tasteless bore".

Preservation status
The Betrayal was the last film directed by Micheaux, who died in 1951. No print of The Betrayal is known to exist, and it is considered a lost film, although the script can be found in the New York State Archives (Motion Picture Scripts Collection) in Albany, New York.

See also
List of lost films

References

External links

Review of film at Variety

1948 films
American black-and-white films
Films directed by Oscar Micheaux
Films shot in Fort Lee, New Jersey
Lost American films
Race films
Films set in South Dakota
Films based on American novels
1940s lost films
1940s English-language films